Domagoj Šarić (born 4 April 1999) is a Croatian professional basketball player who currently plays for Šibenka of the Croatian League. Šarić also plays for the Croatia men's national under-19 basketball team.

In 2014 Šarić signed with GKK Šibenka where he has played a total of 37 games over three season averaging 3.7 points per game in just 6.7 minutes per game.

References

1999 births
Living people
Croatian men's basketball players
GKK Šibenik players
Point guards